Mohan Makijany (24 April 1938 – 10 May 2010), popularly known as Mac Mohan, was an Indian actor, who worked in Hindi cinema. He was known for his villainous roles in films throughout the 1970s and 1980s. He appeared in over 200 films, including Don, Karz, Satte Pe Satta, Zanjeer, Rafoo Chakkar, Shaan, Khoon Pasina, and Sholay.

Early life and career 
Mac Mohan was born in Karachi in British India. Mohan came to Bombay to become a cricketer, but joined theatre and became a Bollywood actor. He learned acting in the Filmalaya School of Acting in Bombay.

Mac Mohan started his Hindi film career as an assistant with director Chetan Anand, before making his debut as an actor in his film, Haqeeqat in 1964. His last appearance was in Atithi Tum Kab Jaoge in a guest appearance.

Besides Hindi movies, he also acted in Bhojpuri, Gujarati, Haryanvi, Marathi, Punjabi, Bengali and Sindhi films. He had delivered dialogue in almost all Indian languages except Odia, as well as in English, Russian and Spanish films.

He is the only actor whose real name "Mac" was used as his character name in many movies.

Illness and death 
In November 2009, a day before he could start the shooting for Ashwini Dheer's Atithi Tum Kab Jaoge?, Mac Mohan was admitted to the Kokilaben Dhirubhai Ambani Hospital in Andheri in Mumbai after his health deteriorated. He had a tumour in the right lung, which grew to be lung cancer and finally killed him on 10 May 2010, aged 72.
Asian Academy of Film & Television had a special prayer meeting on 14 May at Noida Film City. There was also a prayer meeting on the same day at Ajivasan Hall for family and friends, and people from the oldest of his spot boys to Amitabh Bachchan attended the prayer meeting to pay their respects.

Personal life 
Mac Mohan married Minny in 1986 and they had two daughters; Manjari Makijany, Vinati Makijany and a son Vikrant Makijany. He was the maternal uncle of actress Raveena Tandon.  Mac Mohan's wife Minny is an Ayurvedic Doctor. It was when Mac Mohan's father was admitted to Arogya Nidhi Hospital in Juhu that their interaction first started and later the relationship culminated into marriage. In the interview taken by professional writer Niilesh A Raje we learn that Mac Mohan had an excellent command over spoken and written English. Apart from reading newspapers at length, he loved reading Reader's Digest magazine a lot.

Filmography

Television

References

External links 
1. https://web.archive.org/web/20170517041609/http://www.merinews.com/article/actor-mac-mohan-cricketer-who-became-sambha-in-sholay/15884493.shtml at Merinews.com (April 2013)

 

1938 births
2010 deaths
Deaths from lung cancer in India
Indian male film actors
Male actors in Hindi cinema
Male actors from Lucknow
20th-century Indian male actors